Educational settings as place and/or subject in fiction form the theme of this catalogue of titles and authors. Organized alphabetically by the author's last name, the information is further divided by general school environments and those where the university, specifically, is the locale.  The list spans centuries and geographical boundaries, featuring Charlotte Brontë, Agatha Christie and Honoré de Balzac as well as contemporary writers Curtis Sittenfeld, Joyce Carol Oates and Donna Tartt.  For those interested in learning more about the school/university in literature, references are included that provide a more academic study of the subgenre.

School in literature
 Thomas Bailey Aldrich: The Story of a Bad Boy
 Laurie Halse Anderson: Speak
 F. Anstey: Vice Versa
 Louis Auchincloss: The Rector of Justin (see Groton School) and The Headmaster's Dilemma
 Honoré de Balzac: Louis Lambert
 Lynn Barber: An Education
 François Bégaudeau: Entre les murs
 Mark Behr: Embrace
 Alan Bennett: The History Boys
 E. F. Benson: David Blaize
 E. R. Braithwaite: To Sir, with Love
 Sasthi Brata: My God Died Young
 Angela Brazil: many books
 Elinor Brent-Dyer: Chalet School series
 Charlotte Brontë: The Professor and Villette
  Dorita Fairlie Bruce: Dimsie series
 Leo Bruce: Death at St. Asprey's School
 Anthony Buckeridge: Jennings series
 Erika Burkart: Die Vikarin
 Frances Hodgson Burnett: Sara Crewe (aka A Little Princess)
 Dorothy Bussy writing as Olivia: Olivia
 Hezekiah Butterworth: The Log School-House on the Columbia
 Michael Campbell: Lord Dismiss Us
 Eleanor Catton: The Rehearsal
 Anton Chekhov: "The Schoolmaster"
 Agatha Christie: Cat Among the Pigeons
 Jonathan Coe: The Rotters' Club
 Colette: Claudine à l'école
 Ivy Compton-Burnett: Pastors and Masters
 Thomas H. Cook: The Chatham School Affair
 Robert Cormier: The Chocolate War
 Amanda Craig: A Private Place
 Edmund Crispin: Love Lies Bleeding
 Clemence Dane: Regiment of Women
 Roald Dahl: "Galloping Foxley"
 Alphonse Daudet: Le petit chose
 Abha Dawesar: Babyji
 Edmondo De Amicis: Heart
 R. F. Delderfield: To Serve Them All My Days
 Charles Dickens: Nicholas Nickleby
 Stephen Dobyns: Boy in the Water
 Samantha Downing: For Your Own Good
 Ursula Dubosarsky: The Golden Day
 Marie von Ebner-Eschenbach: "Der Vorzugsschüler"
 Ernst Eckstein: Die Klosterschülerin and Gesammelte Schulhumoresken
 Edward Eggleston: The Hoosier Schoolmaster
 Frederic W. Farrar: Eric, or, Little by Little
 Antonia Forest: Autumn Term, End of Term, The Cricket Term, and The Attic Term (four books set at Kingscote School for Girls)
 Hannah Webster Foster: The Boarding School; or, Lessons of a Preceptress to Her Pupils
 Leonhard Frank: Die Ursache
 Andreas Franz: Tod eines Lehrers
 Stephen Fry: The Liar
 Elizabeth George: Well-Schooled in Murder
 Witold Gombrowicz: Ferdydurke
 Gwethalyn Graham: Swiss Sonata
 Henry Green: Concluding
 Daniel Handler: The Basic Eight
 Wolfram Hänel writing as Kurt Appaz: Klassentreffen
 Joanne Harris: Gentlemen & Players
 Jon Hassler: Staggerford
 Ian Hay: Pip
 Zoë Heller: Notes on a Scandal
 Lillian Hellman: The Children's Hour
 John Hersey: The Child Buyer
 Hermann Hesse: Unterm Rad (Beneath the Wheel aka The Prodigy)
 James Hilton: Goodbye, Mr. Chips and Murder at School
 Alan Hollinghurst: The Swimming Pool Library
 Arno Holz: "Der erste Schultag"
 Ödön von Horváth: Jugend ohne Gott (Youth Without God aka Cold Times)
 Thomas Hughes: Tom Brown's School Days
 Evan Hunter: The Blackboard Jungle
 Rachel Hunter: The Schoolmistress: A Moral Tale for Young Ladies
 James Hynes: The Lecturer's Tale
 Robin Jenkins: Happy for the Child
 LouAnne Johnson: My Posse Don't Do Homework (filmed as Dangerous Minds)
 Pamela Hansford Johnson: The Honours Board
 Erich Kästner: Das fliegende Klassenzimmer (The Flying Classroom)
 Bel Kaufman: Up the Down Staircase
 Stephen King (writing as Richard Bachman): Rage (aka Getting It On)
 Rudyard Kipling: Stalky & Co.
 N. H. Kleinbaum: Dead Poets Society (novelisation of the original screenplay)
 John Knowles: A Separate Peace and Peace Breaks Out
 Michael Köhlmeier: Die Musterschüler
 Valery Larbaud: Fermina Márquez
 Siegfried Lenz: Schweigeminute
 Nancy Lieberman: Admissions
 Earl Lovelace: The Schoolmaster
 Arnold Lunn: The Harrovians
 Patrick McCabe: The Dead School
 Megan McCafferty: Sloppy Firsts and Second Helpings
 Frank McCourt: Teacher Man
 Heather McGowan: Schooling
 Arthur Machen: The Secret Glory
 Emily Maguire: Taming the Beast
 Heinrich Mann: Professor Unrat (filmed as The Blue Angel)
 Robert Menasse: Die Vertreibung aus der Hölle
 Gladys Mitchell: Death at the Opera
 Zsigmond Móricz: Légy jó mindhalálig (Be Faithful Unto Death)
 Iris Murdoch: The Sandcastle
 Robert Musil: Die Verwirrungen des Zöglings Törleß (filmed as Der junge Törless)
 R. K. Narayan: The English Teacher
 Andrew Neiderman: Teacher's Pet
 Freya North: Polly
 Géza Ottlik: Iskola a határon
 Robert B. Parker: School Days
 Frances Gray Patton: Good Morning, Miss Dove
 Tom Perrotta: Election and The Abstinence Teacher
 Gervase Phinn: The School Inspector Calls, The Other Side of the Dale, Over Hill and Dale, Head Over Heels in the Dales, and Up and Down in the Dales
 Libby Purves: More Lives Than One
 Terence Rattigan: French Without Tears, The Winslow Boy, and The Browning Version
 Ernest Raymond: Tell England
 Miss Read: Village School and School at Thrush Green
 Talbot Baines Reed: The Fifth Form at St. Dominic's
 Patrick Redmond: The Wishing Game
 Peter Rosegger: Die Schriften des Waldschulmeisters (Manuscripts of a Forest School Master)
 Bernice Rubens: I, Dreyfus
 Paul Russell: The Coming Storm
 John Patrick Shanley: Doubt
 Anita Shreve: Testimony
 Alan Sillitoe: "Mr Raynor the School-Teacher"
 Curtis Sittenfeld: Prep (see Groton School)
 Natsume Sōseki: Botchan
 Muriel Spark: The Prime of Miss Jean Brodie and The Finishing School
 Stephen Spender: "An Elementary School Classroom in a Slum"
 Heinrich Spoerl: Die Feuerzangenbowle
 Jesse Stuart: "Split Cherry Tree"
 Ron Suskind: A Hope in the Unseen
 William Sutcliffe: New Boy
 Josephine Tey: Miss Pym Disposes
 Scarlett Thomas: Oligarchy
 Friedrich Torberg: Der Schüler Gerber
 Anthony Trollope: Doctor Wortle's School
 Hermann Ungar: Die Klasse (The Class)
 Horace Annesley Vachell: The Hill
 Simone van der Vlugt: De reünie (Class Reunion)
 Hugh Walpole: Jeremy at Crale and Mr Perrin and Mr Traill (film version, 1948)
 Robert Walser: Jakob von Gunten
 Alec Waugh: The Loom of Youth
 Evelyn Waugh: Decline and Fall
 Charles Webb: Home School
 Frank Wedekind: Frühlings Erwachen (Spring Awakening)
 Franz Werfel: Der Abituriententag (Class Reunion)
 Antonia White: Frost in May
 Marianne Wiggins: John Dollar
 Nigel Williams: Class Enemy
 Carol Windley: "Home Schooling"
 Christa Winsloe: Child Manuela (filmed as Mädchen in Uniform)
 P. G. Wodehouse: The Pothunters, A Prefect's Uncle, The Gold Bat, Mike
 Alexander Wolf: Zur Hölle mit den Paukern
 Tobias Wolff: Old School
 Richard B. Wright: The Teacher's Daughter
 Richard Yates: A Good School
 Juli Zeh: Spieltrieb

University in literature
 Shmuel Yosef Agnon: Shira
 Kingsley Amis: Lucky Jim
 Dorothy Baker: Trio
 John Barth: Giles Goat-Boy
 Max Beerbohm: Zuleika Dobson
 Saul Bellow: Ravelstein
 E. F. Benson: The Babe B.A.
 E. F. Benson: David of King's
 T. C. Boyle: The Inner Circle
 Malcolm Bradbury: The History Man
 Michael Chabon: Wonder Boys
 Nirad C. Chaudhuri: The Autobiography of an Unknown Indian
 Susan Choi: A Person of Interest
 J. M. Coetzee: Disgrace
 Susan Coll: karlmarx.com and Acceptance
 Alicia D'Anvers: Academia, or, The Humours of the University of Oxford; and The Oxford-Act: a Poem.
 Robertson Davies: The Rebel Angels
 Pamela Dean: Tam Lin
 Don DeLillo: White Noise
 Jenny Diski: Rainforest
 Carl Djerassi: Cantor's Dilemma
 D. J. Enright: Academic Year
 Richard Fariña: Been Down So Long It Looks Like Up to Me
 Michael Frayn: The Trick of It
 Stephen Fry: Making History
 Stephen Fry: The Liar
 John Kenneth Galbraith: A Tenured Professor
 Thomas Hughes: Tom Brown at Oxford
 Hamlet Isakhanli: In Search of Khazar
 Howard Jacobson: Coming from Behind
 Randall Jarrell: Pictures from an Institution
 Denis Johnson: The Name of the World
 Owen Johnson: Stover at Yale
 Pamela Hansford Johnson: Night and Silence Who Is Here?
 Chip Kidd: The Cheese Monkeys: A Novel in Two Semesters
 Neil LaBute: The Shape of Things
 Philip Larkin: Jill 
 Will Lavender: Obedience
 David Leavitt: The Body of Jonah Boyd
 Elinor Lipman: My Latest Grievance
 David Lodge: The British Museum Is Falling Down, Changing Places, Nice Work, Thinks ..., and Deaf Sentence
 Alison Lurie: Imaginary Friends and The War Between the Tates
 Mary McCarthy: The Groves of Academe
 Bernard Malamud: A New Life
 Percy Marks: The Plastic Age
 William Hurrell Mallock: The New Republic
 David Mamet: Oleanna
 Javier Marías: All Souls
 Niq Mhlongo: Dog Eat Dog
 Tomihiko Morimi: The Tatami Galaxy
 Jeffrey Moore: Prisoner in a Red-Rose Chain
 Dhan Gopal Mukerji: Caste and Outcast
 Vladimir Nabokov: Pnin and Pale Fire
 David Nicholls; Starter for Ten
 Charles Gilman Norris: Salt, or the Education of Griffith Adams
 Joyce Carol Oates: Black Girl / White Girl
 John O'Hara: Elizabeth Appleton
 Tim Parks: Europa
 Adrian Jones Pearson: Cow Country
 Tom Perrotta: Joe College
 Francine Prose: Blue Angel
 Ellery Queen: The Campus Murders
 Roger Rosenblatt: Beet
 Philip Roth: The Human Stain and Indignation
 Willy Russell: Educating Rita
 Richard Russo: Straight Man
 Dorothy L. Sayers: Gaudy Night
 Dietrich Schwanitz: Der Campus
 Tom Sharpe: Wilt
 Jane Smiley: Moo
 Zadie Smith: On Beauty
 C P Snow:  The Masters
 Tammar Stein: Light Years
 Neal Stephenson: The Big U
 J. I. M. Stewart: A Staircase in Surrey
 Ivo Stourton: The Night Climbers
 Ron Suskind: A Hope in the Unseen
 Donna Tartt: The Secret History
 Sergio Troncoso: The Nature of Truth
 Evelyn Waugh: Brideshead Revisited
 Hillary Waugh: Last Seen Wearing ...
 Jean Webster: Daddy-Long-Legs and When Patty Went to College
 Paul West: Oxford Days
 Michael Wilding: Academia Nuts
 John Williams: Stoner
 Angus Wilson: Anglo-Saxon Attitudes
 Tom Wolfe: I Am Charlotte Simmons
 Sylvia Hart Wright: Breaking Free: A Novel of the Sixties
 Laurel Zuckerman: Sorbonne Confidential

Further reading
 Elaine Showalter: Faculty Towers: The Academic Novel and Its Discontents (Pennsylvania: University of Pennsylvania, 2005) (a study of the Anglo-American academic novel from the 1950s to the present).

See also
List of fictional British and Irish universities

References

External links

 Selected Academic Novels by William F. Brewer (Department of Psychology, University of Illinois at Urbana–Champaign)
 Books that take place within an academic environment by Áine M. Humble (Department of Family Studies and Gerontology, Mount Saint Vincent University)

Literature lists
Literature by topic
Student culture
Literature
Literature
Literarature